All My Tomorrows may refer to:

 "All My Tomorrows" (song), a 1959 ballad
 All My Tomorrows (Crystal Gayle album), 2003
 All My Tomorrows (Grover Washington Jr. album), 1994